Live in Leipzig is a live album by the Norwegian black metal band Mayhem. It was recorded at the Eiskeller club in Leipzig, Germany on 26 November 1990 but not released until 1993. The songs performed during the concert were from the Pure Fucking Armageddon demo (1986), the Deathcrush EP (1987) and the as-yet-unrecorded album De Mysteriis Dom Sathanas (1994). It is one of the band's few official releases with Dead as vocalist, albeit posthumous.

Reception

AllMusic critic Steve Huey wrote, "With a shortage of official Mayhem material featuring this [classic] lineup, it's a necessary item for devoted fans, even in spite of the less-than-ideal sound quality."

German magazine Rock Hard included it in the list "250 Black-Metal-Alben, die man kennen sollte" ("250 Black Metal Albums You Should Know").

Track listing

Personnel 
 Dead (Per Yngve Ohlin) – vocals
 Euronymous (Øystein Aarseth) – guitar
 Necrobutcher (Jørn Stubberud) – bass guitar
 Hellhammer (Jan Axel Blomberg) – drums

References 

Mayhem (band) albums
1993 live albums